Reinventing a Lost Art was the debut album by New Jersey-based indie, pop-punk group, Tokyo Rose. This album was the only that featured Greg Doran on guitar, as he, soon after the release, left the band to become a guitar teacher in his hometown. Since the record's release, two more albums have been recorded, and fared better than the previous: New American Saint and 2007's The Promise in Compromise.

Reception

Allmusic reviewed the record as "misleading", yet "admirable" at the same time.

Track listing
 Saturday, Everyday (3:23)
 Don't Look Back (3:21)
 Right Through Your Teeth (3:36)
 Word Of Mouth (2:40)
 Take The Wheel (3:35)
 Weapon Of Choice (3:32)
 You Ruined Everything (4:21)
 Phonecords and Postcards (2:52)
 Katherine Please (4:42)
 Before You Burn (4:13)

External links
[ Allmusic.com review]

2003 debut albums
Tokyo Rose (band) albums